James Edward Holder (August 24, 1940 – September 25, 1966) was an American football player who played running back at Panhandle A&M College—now Oklahoma Panhandle State University, setting the NAIA single season records for rushes and yards gained during his senior year. An ROTC member, Holder entered the United States Army after graduation and was killed while serving as an air cavalry officer during the Vietnam War. On July 21, 2012, Holder was inducted posthumously into the College Football Hall of Fame, the first from his school ever so enshrined.

Career
Born in Wichita Falls, Texas in 1940, Holder attended school in his home town and moved to Goodwell, Oklahoma in 1958 to enter Panhandle A&M College. A three-sport performer, Holder played golf and football for the Aggies, while setting track and field records in the long jump and 100-yard dash. After his freshman year, Holder returned to Wichita Falls to attend Midwestern State University, then re-entered Panhandle State in 1961 to complete his college athletic career.

Holder's team lost one game in his sophomore year, and Holder was selected as All Oklahoma Collegiate Athletic Conference honorable mention. As a junior, Holder ran 77 times for the Aggies, gaining 565 yards, averaging 109.3 yards per game and was again an honorable mention All Conference. During his senior year in 1963, Holder broke school and NAIA records by rushing for 1775 yards on 275 carries in ten games. His NAIA rushing yards record would stand for over 20 years. In addition, Holder accounted for over two thirds of his team's total offense; he was selected All Conference and NAIA All American.

In 1964, Holder served his team as student assistant football coach, completed his degree in health and physical education, then became a commissioned officer in the Army. He briefly played semi-pro football while training at Fort Benning, and went to Vietnam with his unit, Delta Company, 1st Battalion, 5th Cavalry, 1st Cavalry Division (Airmobile). In September 1966, Holder lost his life in a helicopter crash.

Legacy
Holder's name appears on Washington, D.C.'s Vietnam Veterans Memorial on panel 11E, line 15. His school retired his uniform number 33, the first ever retired by Panhandle State. In 2012 Holder was inducted the College Football Hall of Fame. He is the only player from Oklahoma Panhandle State University to be a member of the Hall.

References

External links
 

1940 births
1966 deaths
American football running backs
Oklahoma Panhandle State Aggies football players
All-American college football players
College Football Hall of Fame inductees
Oklahoma Panhandle State Aggies men's golfers
Oklahoma Panhandle State Aggies men's track and field athletes
Midwestern State University alumni
American military personnel killed in the Vietnam War
United States Army officers
People from Wichita Falls, Texas
Players of American football from Texas
Victims of aviation accidents or incidents in Vietnam
United States Army personnel of the Vietnam War
Military personnel from Texas